Unió Esportiva Vilassar de Mar is a Spanish football club based in Vilassar de Mar, in the autonomous community of Catalonia. Founded in 1923 it currently plays in Tercera División RFEF – Group 5, holding home matches at Estadi Municipal Xevi Ramon, with a 3,000-seat capacity.  

Team colors are red and white.

History
The club was founded on 6 June 1923, with Joaquim Carreras as its first president.

Season to season

15 seasons in Tercera División
1 season in Tercera División RFEF

References

External links
Official website 

Football clubs in Catalonia
Association football clubs established in 1923
1923 establishments in Spain